Tide Head is a neighbourhood of Campbellton in Restigouche County, New Brunswick, Canada. It held village status prior to 2023.

History

The first settlers of the area were Scottish.  Early area farms were owned by Moffats, Gerrards, Duncans, Adams, Duffs, Barclays, Christophers, and Ayletts.  Most of these early settlers, such as James Aylett, a British subject in the 20th regiment of his Majesty's Army; Thomas Barclay, a Scotsman; and Robert Adams are buried in the Athol House Cemetery near Frasers Mill.  Graves in the cemetery date from as early as 1791.  The Athol House Cemetery is the oldest British Cemetery in Restigouche County.

The railway that passes through Tide Head was started in 1875 and the first train went west in 1878.  The train passes through a tunnel in the hillside of Morrisey Rock, the only active tunnel on the railway system in the Maritimes.

Tide Head was incorporated into a village in 1966. The first mayor of the incorporated village was Jim Adams. The most recent mayor of Tide Head is Randy Hunter.

On 1 January 2023, Tide Head amalgamated with the city of Campbellton. The community's name remains in official use.

Tide Head bills itself as the Fiddlehead Capital of the World and is predominantly English.

Geography

Demographics

Population trend

Mother tongue (2016)

Notable people

See also
List of communities in New Brunswick

References

External links
Official Village website

Communities in Restigouche County, New Brunswick
Former villages in New Brunswick